Larche is a commune in the Corrèze department in central France.

Population

The inhabitants of Larche are called the Larchois and the Larchoises.

In 2016, the municipality had 1,595 inhabitants, up 0.44% compared to 2011 (Corrèze: -0.38%, France excluding Mayotte: +2.44%).

See also
Communes of the Corrèze department

References

Communes of Corrèze